Davies Bay is a bay on the coast,  wide, between Drake Head and Cape Kinsey, Antarctica. It was discovered in February 1911 from the Terra Nova (Lieutenant Harry L.L. Pennell, Royal Navy) of the British Antarctic Expedition, 1910–13, and named for Francis E.C. Davies, shipwright on the Terra Nova.

Further reading
 Ute Christina Herzfeld, Atlas of Antarctica: Topographic Maps from Geostatistical Analysis of Satellite Radar Altimeter Data, P 162
 Roberto Cervellati, M. Chiara Ramorino, COMPOSITE GAZETTEER OF ANTARCTICA (CGA), PP 40, 48
 AUSTRALIANS MAKE DISCOVERIES IN OATES LAND, PP 395 – 396

References 

Bays of Antarctica
Bodies of water of Oates Land